The Serenade No. 10 for winds in B-flat major, K. 361/370a, is a serenade by Wolfgang Amadeus Mozart scored for thirteen instruments: twelve winds and string bass. The piece was probably composed in 1781 or 1782 and is often known by the subtitle Gran Partita, though the title is a misspelling and not in Mozart's hand. It consists of seven movements.

Composition date
Some prominent authorities (Köchel, Tyson and Edge) suggest that the paper and watermarks of this work prove a composition date of 1781 or 1782. That the work was specially composed for a public concert given by Anton Stadler on March 23, 1784, is less likely, because this performance has no proven connection with the date of composition and only marks an ante quem date. The autograph of this work contains 24 leaves of paper-type 57. Four other compositions that used this paper can be securely dated to 1781. It was shown by Alan Tyson that this fact is sufficiently compelling to presume that K. 361 was composed in 1781. There is no evidence whatsoever that the 24 leaves of this paper-type that appear in the autograph of K. 361 were ever intended for anything other than K. 361, and it is clear from the pattern of paper-usage that K. 361 was the principal project for which Mozart acquired that paper-type. 

The documentary history also shows that there is an unequivocal reference to wind-band music in Vienna in 1781. The performance of only four movements in 1784 generated the belief that the work was composed in two stages. Bastiaan Blomhert has made a compelling argument that the octet version of movements 1, 2, 3 and 7 of the Gran Partita are the original version, one that Mozart enlarged in 1784 for the Akademie of Anton Stadler in the Vienna Burgtheater.

Instrumentation

The work is scored for 2 oboes, 2 clarinets, 2 basset horns, 2 bassoons, 4 horns and double bass. In performance, the double bass is sometimes replaced by a contrabassoon. Mozart's Harmoniemusik, including K. 361, shows his interest in texture through his use of unique combinations of instruments for the era, scoring, rhythm and articulation.

Movements

The serenade is in seven movements as follows:

The opening movement begins with a slow introduction in B flat major in which tutti syncopated rhythms are set in opposition to solo passages for clarinet and oboe. This leads into the Allegro moderato, which is a monothematic sonata form. The first theme of the exposition opens, originally presented in B flat major in the clarinets, later returns in F major in the basset horns and oboes in a modified form as the second theme. This theme continues to be explored in the development and returns in the recapitulation, this time in B flat major both times.

The second movement is a minuet featuring two contrasting trio sections. The minuet section is in B flat major and uses all the instruments extensively. The first trio is in E-flat major and employs only the clarinets and basset horns. This section leads into a repeat of the minuet section. The second trio section is in the relative minor, G minor, and extensively uses the solo oboe, basset horn and bassoon.

Described by Goodwin as "virtually an 'operatic' ensemble of passionate feeling and sensuous warmth", the third movement, marked Adagio, is in E flat major. A syncopated pulse occurs almost throughout the movement while solo lines alternate between the solo oboe, clarinet, and basset horn.

The fourth movement is a second minuet; like the second movement, it has two trio sections. The fast, staccato minuet section is in B flat major. The first trio, by contrast, has fewer staccato notes and is in the parallel minor, B-flat minor. After the minuet section is repeated, the second trio is played. This section is in F major and is largely legato.

The fifth movement, labeled Romanze, returns to the slow tempo and E flat major tonality of the third movement. The movement begins and ends with an Adagio section in the tonic and in triple meter with many long notes in the melody. Contrasting with these sections is an Allegretto section between them, which is in C minor and features constant pulse in the bassoons.

The sixth movement is a set of six variations on an Andante theme in B flat major. The theme is presented primarily by the solo clarinet. The variations make use of various rhythmic motives and often feature solo instruments; for example, the first variation features the solo oboe. Unlike the other variations, all of which are in B flat major, the fourth variation is in B flat minor. The last two variations are in different tempos from the rest of the movement: the fifth is marked Adagio, while the sixth is marked Allegro. The last variation is also in triple meter, in contrast with the other variations, which are in duple meter.

The sixth movement, with the third variation slightly altered, was adapted by Mozart from the second movement of the Flute Quartet in C major (K. 285b).

The seventh and last movement is a rondo. The movement employs many tutti passages in which the oboes and clarinets play in unison, particularly in the rondo theme. The episodes between the returns of the theme feature a greater degree of interplay between the instruments.

References in popular culture
In the 1984 film Amadeus, Antonio Salieri's first encounter with Mozart is at a performance of this work. Salieri has not been impressed with Mozart's boorish behavior before the performance, but as he looks at the music on the page, he describes the beauty and delight of the solo oboe's entry soon thereafter followed by the clarinet's line (in the third movement), leading him to say, "This was no composition by a performing monkey. This was a music I'd never heard. Filled with such longing, such unfulfillable longing. It seemed to me that I was hearing the voice of God." It is at this point that Salieri first questions how God could choose a vulgar man like Mozart as his voice; this question becomes a primary theme of the film.
In How I Met Your Mother season 4, episode 2; "The Best Burger in New York", the third movement is played while Marshall praises "the best burger in New York" by saying: "Just a Burger? Just a burger. Robin, it's so much more than 'just a burger.' I mean... that first bite-oh, what heaven that first bite is. The bun, like a sesame freckled breast of an angel, resting gently on the ketchup and mustard below, flavors mingling in a seductive pas de deux. And then... a pickle! The most playful little pickle! Then a slice of tomato, a leaf of lettuce and a... a patty of ground beef so exquisite, swirling in your mouth, breaking apart, and combining again in a fugue of sweets and savor so delightful. This is no mere sandwich of grilled meat and toasted bread, Robin. This is God, speaking to us through food.", which is a spoof of the scene in Amadeus described above.
In the 2009 film Bright Star, the third movement is sung a capella during a dinner party. It is also used during the end credits as background music to John Keats' recitation of the poem "Ode to a Nightingale".
In the television drama The West Wing, the third movement is played at the end of season 7, episode 4, during a recital attended by President Josiah Bartlet.

References

Bibliography
Leeson, Daniel N., “A Revisit: Mozart’s Serenade for Thirteen Instruments”, K. 361 (370a), the “Gran Partitta”, in Mozart-Jarbuch, 1997 (Kassel: Bärenreiter)
Tyson, Alan, Mozart: Studies of the Autograph Scores, Cambridge, MA: Harvard University Press, 1987. .

External links 

Mozart's Manuscript (K. 361) at the Library of Congress I:p. 1, II:p. 25, III:p. 34, IV:p. 44, V:p. 52, VI:p. 62, VII:p. 81

Serenade 10
1781 compositions
Compositions in B-flat major
1782 compositions